Slieve Binnian is one of the Mourne Mountains in County Down, Northern Ireland, 9 km north of Kilkeel. The summit is broad and flat with rocky tors at the north and south ends, with the Back Castles, impressive towers of granite, in between. To the south-west is Wee Binnian (460m). It lies east of Silent Valley Reservoir and west of the Annalong Valley. The Mourne Wall also crosses over Slieve Binnian.

The mountain is in the townland of Brackenagh East Upper (379 acres), the civil parish of Kilkeel and the historic barony of Mourne.

Places of interest
Overlooking Annalong Wood on the eastern slopes of Slieve Binnian is the disused quarry of Douglas Crag.
What appears to be the remains of an abandoned quarrying village lies on the south eastern slopes of Slieve Binnan. Ruins of rock huts are spread across a landscape littered with part quarried rock.

Binnian Tunnel
The Binnian Tunnel (2.5 miles long) was built between 1947 and 1950/51 underneath Slieve Binnian, to transport water from the Annalong Valley to the Silent Valley. A workforce of 150 was involved in two tunnelling teams which started from opposite ends and met in the middle nearly 800m under the roof of the mountain. Having been carefully measuring their positions the whole time, they found they were only two inches off course when the two tunnels met.

References

External links
 Photos of Slieve Binnian
 Walking Ireland’s Iconic Mountains – Number 3: Slieve Binnian from Walking & Hiking in Ireland

Mountains and hills of County Down
Marilyns of Northern Ireland
Hewitts of Northern Ireland
Mountains under 1000 metres